Millard House, also known as La Miniatura, is a textile block house designed by Frank Lloyd Wright and built in 1923 in Pasadena, California.  It was listed on the National Register of Historic Places in 1976.

Wright's textile block houses

The Millard House was the first of Frank Lloyd Wright's four "textile block" houses — all built in Los Angeles County in 1923 and 1924. Wright took on the Millard House following his completion of the Hollyhock House in Hollywood and the Imperial Hotel in Japan.

By this time, Wright felt typecast as the Prairie house architect and sought to broaden his architectural vision.  Wright turned to the concrete block as his new building material.  Wright wrote in his autobiography that he chose to build with concrete blocks as they were "the cheapest (and ugliest) thing in the building world," and he wanted to see "what could be done with that gutter-rat." The textile-block houses were named for their richly textured brocade-like concrete walls.  The style was an experiment by Wright in modular housing; he sought to develop an inexpensive and simple method of construction that would enable ordinary people to build their own homes with stacked blocks.  By adding ornamental designs to mass-produced blocks, Wright hoped the blocks could become a "masonry fabric capable of great variety in architectural beauty."  Writer Hugh Hart described Wright's concept this way: "By unifying decoration and function, exterior and interior, earth and sky — perforated blocks served as skylights — Wright saw his Textile Block Method approach as an utterly modern, and democratic, expression of his organic architecture ideal."

Design of Millard House

Wright was commissioned to build Millard House by Alice Millard, a rare-book dealer for whom Wright had built a house in Highland Park, Illinois in 1906.  Seeking to integrate the Millard House with the land, Wright designed the house to cling to the lot's steep ravine, nestled it among the trees, and fabricated the house’s concrete blocks using sand, gravel and minerals found on the property.  By using roughly textured, earth-toned blocks, he sought to blend the house with the color and form of the trees and hillside.  While the design was in most ways a departure from Wright's prior work, it was consistent with his lifelong love of natural materials and his belief that buildings should complement their surroundings.  He later said that Millard House "belonged to the ground on which it stood."

The blocks were created in wooden molds with patterns on the outside and smooth on the inside.  The blocks feature a symmetrical pattern of a cross with a square in each corner.  Wright reinforced the blocks using conventional mortar.  The project cost $17,000 — 70% more than the $10,000 budget Millard had given to Wright.  Some accounts state that the builder walked off the job, "leaving Wright to finish the project himself, out of his own pocket".

The  house consists of a vertical three-story block.  The first floor has the kitchen, servant's room and a dining room opening onto a terrace with a reflecting pool.  The second floor has the main entrance, guest room, and a two-story living room with a fireplace and balcony.  The third floor contained Millard's bedroom with a balcony overlooking the living room and outdoor terrace.

Like many of Wright's households , Millard House suffered from leaks during rains.  After the house flooded in a storm,  Millard wrote a letter to Wright complaining about the inadequate storm drain that resulted in the basement filling entirely with muddy water and the water rising to six inches (152 mm) in the dining room.

Millard added a separate studio in 1926, designed by Wright's son, Lloyd Wright.

Critical response

The initial critical response to Millard House and the textile block structures was not positive. The homes were greeted with "howls of laughter", as Beaux Arts-trained architects were "appalled" to see a common building material used for the facades and interior walls of expensive homes.  As The New York Times later said of the California houses built by Wright in the 1920s: "It didn’t help that he was obsessed at the time with an untested and (supposedly) low-cost method of concrete-block construction. What kind of rich person, many wondered, would want to live in such a house? Aside from the free-spirited oil heiress Aline Barnsdall, with whom he fought constantly, his motley clients included a jewelry salesman, a rare-book dealing widow and a failed doctor."

However, Wright himself took great pride in Millard House.  He said of it: "I would rather have built this little house than St. Peter's in Rome."  Over the years, critical views of Millard House became positive, and it is now considered one of Wright's finest works.

In 1965, the Los Angeles Times columnist Art Seidenbaum wrote: "Environmentally, the place is fascinating because it still looks modern in a neighborhood that is gracious but aging.  Or, maybe better, the Millard house is of no time and its own place."

In 1969, Millard House was ranked as one of the 12 most significant landmarks in the Los Angeles area by a panel of ten distinguished citizens and architecture experts.

In 1980, The New York Times noted that the Millard House was known around the world and ranked it among the few buildings in Los Angeles that "have become classic works of the 20th Century."

In popular culture
The house appears as the Secarus IV home of the Albino, an alien villain in the Star Trek: Deep Space Nine episode "Blood Oath", which aired on American television on March 27, 1994.

The house appears as Arnold Weber's family home in the second and third seasons of HBO's science fiction series Westworld.

See also
 List of Registered Historic Places in Los Angeles County, California
 Ennis House, Samuel Freeman House and Storer House — Wright's other three textile block houses

References

Storrer, William Allin. The Frank Lloyd Wright Companion. University Of Chicago Press, 2006,  (S.214)

External links

 Museum of Modern Art article and image of Wright's plans for Millard House
 Photos on Arcaid

Frank Lloyd Wright buildings
Houses on the National Register of Historic Places in California
Buildings and structures on the National Register of Historic Places in Pasadena, California
History of Los Angeles County, California
Modernist architecture in California
Houses completed in 1923
Houses in Pasadena, California
1923 establishments in California